Shot/reverse shot (or shot/countershot) is a film technique where one character is shown looking at another character (often off-screen), and then the other character is shown looking back at the first character (a  or ). Since the characters are shown facing in opposite directions, the viewer assumes that they are looking at each other.

Context
Shot/reverse shot is a feature of the "classical" Hollywood style of continuity editing, which deemphasizes transitions between shots such that the spectator perceives one continuous action that develops linearly, chronologically, and logically. It is an example of an eyeline match.

References

Sources 

Cinematography
Film editing
Cinematic techniques
Television terminology